The western shriketit (Falcunculus leucogaster) is a species of bird in the family Falcunculidae.
It is sparsely distributed in south-western Western Australia.

References

Falcunculus
Birds described in 1838
Taxa named by John Gould